The University of Maryland School of Public Health is located in College Park, Maryland. U.S. News & World Report ranked the school 20th among all schools and programs of public health in 2021. It contains the departments of Department of Behavioral and Community Health, Department of Epidemiology and Biostatistics, Department of Family Science, Department of Health Policy and Management, Department of Kinesiology and
Maryland Institute for Applied Environmental Health. It also includes the Herschel S. Horowitz Center for Health Literacy, the nation's first academic center focused on improving health literacy, the Maryland Center for Health Equity, which focuses on eliminating racial and ethnic health disparities, and the Prevention Research Center, a Centers for Disease Control and Prevention (CDC)-funded center focused on improving mental health and eliminating health disparities and related social injustices experienced by LGBTQ+ persons. 

Boris D. Lushniak, MD, MPH, who served as U.S. Deputy Surgeon General from November 2010 to September 2015, is dean of the UMD School of Public Health.

References

School of Public Health
Maryland
Public Health
Educational institutions established in 2006
2006 establishments in Maryland